The Finance Act 2006 (c 25) is an Act of the Parliament of the United Kingdom prescribing changes to Excise Duties; Value Added Tax; Income Tax; Corporation Tax; and Capital Gains Tax. It enacts the 2006 Budget speech made by Chancellor of the Exchequer Gordon Brown to the Parliament of the United Kingdom.

In the UK, the Chancellor delivers an annual Budget speech outlining changes in spending, tax and duty. The respective year's Finance Act is the mechanism to enact the changes.

The rules governing the various taxation methods are contained within the various taxation acts. (For instance Capital Gains Tax Legislation is contained within Taxation of Chargeable Gains Act 1992.) The Finance Act details amendments to be made to a variety of such Acts.

The Act made changes to the treatment of trusts for Inheritance Tax purposes. Specifically, it removed the exemption from inheritance tax for accumulation and maintenance trusts.

Section 28 - Relief for research and development: subjects of clinical trials
The Finance Act 2006, Section 28 (Appointed Day) Order 2008 (S.I. 2008/1878 (C.80) was made under section 28(5).

References

United Kingdom Acts of Parliament 2006
2006 in economics
Tax legislation in the United Kingdom